General Overton may refer to:

Norris W. Overton (born 1926), U.S. Air Force brigadier general
Robert Overton (c. 1609–1678), English Civil War major general
Walter Hampden Overton (1788–1845), Louisiana Militia major general